Biomax Informatics is a Munich-based software company specializing in research software for bioinformatics. Biomax was founded in 1997 and has its roots in the Munich Information Center for Protein Sequences (MIPS). The company's customer base consists of companies and research organizations in the areas of drug discovery, diagnostics, fine chemicals, food and plant production. In addition to exclusive software tools, Biomax Informatics provides services and curated knowledge bases.

In September 2007, Biomax Informatics acquired the Viscovery software business of the Austrian data mining specialist Eudaptics Software.

Biomax Informatics and Sophic Systems Alliance Inc. (USA) participate in the Cancer Gene Data Curation Project with the National Cancer Institute (USA). This project maintains a public data set of cancer-related genes and drugs. This data set has been integrated with the NCI's  (cancer Bioinformatics Infrastructure Objects) domain model which is part of the CaBIG Integrative Cancer Research (ICR) workspace. This Cancer Gene Index can be obtained separately from an NCI web site.

Products 
 BioXM Knowledge Management Environment
 BioRS Integration and Retrieval System
 Pedant-Pro Sequence Analysis Suite

Subsidiaries
 Viscovery Software GmbH

See also
 Bioinformatics
 Bioinformatics companies

References

External links
 Biomax Informatics official homepage
 Viscovery Software official homepage
 Cancer Gene Data Curation Project

Research support companies
Bioinformatics companies
Biotechnology companies of Germany
Companies based in Munich
Companies established in 1997